Stephen Fain Williams (September 23, 1936 – August 7, 2020) was a United States circuit judge of the United States Court of Appeals for the District of Columbia Circuit until his death from complications of COVID-19 on August 7, 2020.

Early life and career
Born in New York City, he was the son of prominent lawyer C. Dickerman Williams. He received a Bachelor of Arts magna cum laude in 1958 from Yale University, where he was a member of the Manuscript Society. He then received a Juris Doctor magna cum laude in 1961 from Harvard Law School. He was in the United States Army Reserve as a Private E-2 from 1961 to 1962. He engaged in private practice from 1962 to 1966 and became an Assistant United States Attorney for the Southern District of New York in 1966. From 1969 to his appointment to the bench, he taught at the University of Colorado School of Law. During this time, he also served as a Visiting Professor of Law at UCLA, University of Chicago Law School, and Southern Methodist University and he was a consultant to the Administrative Conference of the United States and the Federal Trade Commission.

Federal judicial service
Williams was nominated by President Ronald Reagan on February 19, 1986, to a seat on the United States Court of Appeals for the District of Columbia Circuit vacated by Judge Malcolm R. Wilkey. He was confirmed by the United States Senate on June 13, 1986, and received commission on June 16, 1986. He assumed senior status on September 30, 2001.

In March 2017, Williams questioned if the government could constitutionally keep all prisoner court filings secret when the court, unanimous in judgment but in divided opinions, found that the press could not access classified video of Jihad Ahmed Mustafa Dhiab being force fed during the Guantanamo Bay hunger strikes.

Author
Williams was the author of numerous books and scholarly articles. His book, Liberal Reform in an Illiberal Regime, 1906–1915: The Creation of Private Property in Russia, was described by former acting Prime Minister of Russia Yegor Gaidar as "absolutely splendid".

Here are some of his other works:

The Reformer: How One Liberal Fought to Preempt the Russian Revolution, 2017
The Natural Gas Revolution of 1985, 1985
Cases on Oil and Gas Law (With R. Maxwell, P. Martin and B. Kramer), 6th ed., 1992
Subjectivity, Expression & Privacy: Problems of Aesthetic Regulation,  62 Minnesota Law Review 1, 1977
Running Out: The Problem of Exhaustible Resources, 7 Journal of Legal Studies 165, 1978
Solar 'Access' and Property Rights: A Maverick Analysis, 11 Connecticut Law Review 430, 1979
Implied Covenants for Development and Exploration in Oil and Gas Leases - The Determination of Profitability, 27 Kansas Law Review 443, 1979
The Static Conception of the Common Law: A Comment, 9 Journal of Legal Studies 277, 1980
Getting Downtown - Relief of Highway Congestion Through Pricing, Regulation, p. 45, March/April, 1981
Implied Covenants in Oil and Gas Leases: Some General Principles, 29 Kansas Law Review 153, 1981
An Energy Policy Perspective on Solar Hot Water Equipment Mandates, 1 UCLA Journal on Environmental Law and Policy 135, 1981
'Liberty' In the Due Process Clauses of the Fifth and Fourteenth Amendments: The Intentions of the Framers, 53 Colorado Law Review 117, 1981
Severance Taxes: The Supreme Court's Role in Preserving a National Common Market for Energy Supplies, 53 Colorado Law Review 281, 1982
Liberty and Property: The Problem of Government Benefits, 12 Journal of Legal Studies 3, 1983
The Requirement of Beneficial Use as a Cause of Waste in Water Resource Development, 23 Natural Resource Journal 7, 1983
Energy Policy in the Cold Light of Morning, 61 Texas Law Review 571, 1983
Free Trade in Water Resources: Sporhase v. Nebraska ex rel. Douglas, 2 S. Ct. Economic Review 89, 1984
Implied Covenants' Threat to the Value of Oil and Gas Reserves, 36 Institute on Oil and Gas Law and Taxation, Chapter 3, 1985
Federal Preemption of State Conservation Laws After the Natural Gas Policy Act: A Preliminary Look, 56 Colorado Law Review 521, 1985
The Proposed Sea-Change in Natural Gas Regulation, 6 Energy Law Journal 233, 1985
The Law of Prior Appropriation: Possible Lessons for Hawaii 25 Natural Resource Journal 911, 1985
The Legal Integration of Energy Markets (With Terence Daintith) Vol. 5 of Integration Through Law: Europe and the American Federal Experience, 1987
Second Best: The Soft Underbelly of Deterrence Theory in Tort, 106 Harvard Law Review 932, 1993
Hybrid Rulemaking, Under the Administrative Procedure Act: A Legal and Empirical Analysis, 42 University of Chicago Law Review 401, 1975
Panel: Culpability, Restitution, and the Environment: The Vitality of Common Law Rules 21 Ecology Law Quarterly, 559, 1994
Unconstitutional Conditions Through a Libertarian Prism Public Interest Law Review, 159, 1994
Legal Versus Non-Legal Theory 17 Harvard Journal of Law and Public Policy, 79, Winter, 1997
Court-Gazing: Reviews of David C. Savage, Turning Right: The Making of the REhnquist Supreme Court, and H.W. Perry, Jr., Deciding to Decide: Agenda Setting in the United States Supreme Court, 91 Michigan Law Review, 1158, 1993
The Roots of Deference (Review of Christopher F. Edley, Jr., Administrative Law: Rethinking Judicial Control of Bureaucracy) 100 Yale Law Journal 1103, 1991
Background Norms in the Regulatory State, (Review of Cass R. Sunstein, After the Rights Revolution: Reconceiving the Regulatory State) 58 University of Chicago Law Review 419, 1991
Fingers in the Pie (Review of Jeremy Rabkin, Judicial Compulsions: How Public Law Distorts Public Policy) 68 Texas Law Review 1303, 1990
Review of Morton Horwitz, The Transformation of American Law, 25 UCLA Law Review 1187, 1978
Review of Richard A. Posner, Economic Analysis of Law, 45 University of Colorado Law Review 437-53, 1974
Fixing the Rate of Return After Duquesne, 8 Yale Journal on Reg. 159, 1991
Pollution Control: Taxes v. Regulation (International Institute for Economic Research, Original Paper 23), August, 1979
Optimizing Water Use: The Return Flow Issue, 44 University of Colorado Law Review 301, 1973
Risk Regulation and Its hazards: Review of Stephen Breyer, Breaking the Vicious Circle, 93 Mich. L. Rev. 1498, 1995
Deregulatory Takings and Breach of the Regulatory Contract: A Comment  71 N.Y.U. L. Rev. 1000, 1996

Death
Williams was diagnosed with COVID-19 in May 2020, during the COVID-19 pandemic in Washington, D.C. He was admitted to Sibley Memorial Hospital and put on a ventilator. On August 7, 2020, after about two months in the hospital, he died from complications as a result of the virus.

References

Sources

External links
 

1936 births
2020 deaths
20th-century American judges
Assistant United States Attorneys
Harvard Law School alumni
Judges of the United States Court of Appeals for the D.C. Circuit
Lawyers from New York City
Military personnel from New York City
Southern Methodist University faculty
United States court of appeals judges appointed by Ronald Reagan
UCLA School of Law faculty
University of Chicago Law School faculty
Writers from New York City
Yale College alumni
Deaths from the COVID-19 pandemic in Washington, D.C.